James Robert Purvis (born 31 May 1954) is a former English cricketer.  Purvis was a left-handed batsman who bowled left-arm medium-fast.  He was born in Blyth, Northumberland.

Purvis made his debut for Northumberland in the 1979 Minor Counties Championship against Lincolnshire.  Purvis played Minor counties cricket for Northumberland from 1979 to 1991, which included 69 Minor Counties Championship appearances and 5 MCCA Knockout Trophy matches.  He made his List A debut against Essex in the 1987 NatWest Trophy.  In this match, he took his only List A wicket, dismissing Graham Gooch.  With the bat, he was dismissed for a duck by Neil Foster.  He made a further List A appearance against Surrey in the 1989 NatWest Trophy.  He bowled 4 wicket-less overs in this match, while with the bat he wasn't called upon.

References

External links
Jim Purvis at ESPNcricinfo
Jim Purvis at CricketArchive

1954 births
Living people
People from Blyth, Northumberland
English cricketers
Northumberland cricketers
Cricketers from Northumberland